The Kaiserslautern University of Applied Sciences (German: Hochschule Kaiserslautern, HS Kaiserslautern) is a Hochschule (University of Applied Sciences) with 3 campuses located in Kaiserslautern, Germany, in Pirmasens, Germany and in Zweibrücken, Germany.  With about 6300 students (as of 2018/19), it is one of the largest Universities of Applied Sciences in the state of Rhineland-Palatinate. Kaiserslautern University of Applied Sciences stands for over 160 years of tradition in engineering education.

Departments
Applied Logistics and Polymer Sciences
Building and Design
Business Administration
Engineering
Computer Sciences / Microsystems Technology

Locations

Kaiserslautern 
Kaiserslautern is the headquarter for the department of Building and Design and Engineering. The Campus is split into the Morlauter Street and the Schoenstraße but shall be brought together at the old area of the Kammgarnspinnerei.

Pirmasens 
The Campus of Pirmasens is specified in the department of Applied Logistics and Polymer Sciences and is the smallest of the three locations.

Zweibrücken 
The Campus in Zweibrücken is specified in the departments of Business Administration and Computer Sciences/Microsystem Technology. The Campus was founded in 1994 at the area of former military base of the US. Beside the old but renovated buildings, the University expanded the Campus and constructed new buildings designed along American style.

See also
 Hochschule
 Fachhochschule

References

External links
University of Applied Sciences Kaiserslautern 

Universities and colleges in Rhineland-Palatinate
University of Applied Sciences
Universities in Germany
Universities of Applied Sciences in Germany